Class 800 may refer to:

British Rail Class 800
GSR Class 800
JR Freight Class EH800
South Australian Railways 800 class
800 Series Shinkansen